Parliamentary elections were held in Ceylon  in 1956. They were a watershed in the country's political history, and was the first elections fought to realistically challenge the ruling United National Party. The former Leader of the House, S.W.R.D. Bandaranaike who was passed over after the death of the first Prime Minister D. S. Senanayake, crossed over to the opposition to form the Sri Lanka Freedom Party to launch his bid for Prime Minister.

Background
The UNP government of John Kotelawala had been rapidly losing steam.  It faced widespread criticism over Ceylon's poor economic performance.  Meanwhile, the Sri Lanka Freedom Party now championed a popular socialist platform, calling for English to be replaced by Sinhala as the island's official language.

The UNP resisted this out of deference to Ceylon's Tamil minority, but changed its position in early 1956.  This only served to cost the UNP its Tamil support while gaining it little among the Sinhalese.

The Lanka Sama Samaja Party and the Communist Party campaigned for parity of status between Sinhala and Tamil, with both to jointly replace English as the official language.

The Tamil parties campaigned to keep English as the official language.

SLFP leader S. W. R. D. Bandaranaike assembled a coalition with a group of small Marxist parties to form the Mahajana Eksath Peramuna.

Results
Bandaranaike's coalition obtained a solid majority government and he became prime minister.

Legacy
The SLFP campaign of 1956 was the first in Ceylon's history where communal feelings against the minority Tamil community were deliberately stirred up by Sinhalese politicians for electoral gain.  The SLFP tried to blame the high unemployment Sinhalese youth faced on the Tamils and in effect promised not to correct injustices but to openly discriminate against Tamils via a policy of official unilingualism.

The hard feelings from this campaign contributed towards the eruption, nearly three decades later, of the path to civil war.

However, it also changed the character of politics in the country from the elitism that had characterised it hitherto. Members of Parliament from other parties than the Left were middle class, working class or farmers. Henceforth electorates were addressed in their mother tongue at election meetings (as the LSSP and CP had done from inception) instead of English.

Notes

References

 
 
 
 

 
Ceylon
Parliamentary elections in Sri Lanka
Origins of the Sri Lankan Civil War
April 1956 events in Asia
Election and referendum articles with incomplete results